Šilai is a village in Jonava district municipality, in Kaunas County, in central Lithuania. According to the 2011 Lithuania census, the village has a population of 347 people. Administrative centre of Šilai Eldership.

Famous villagers 
Simonas Martynas Kosakovskis, Polish-Lithuanian nobleman (szlachcic), and one of the leaders of the Targowica Confederation.
Juozapas Kazimieras Kosakovskis, bishop of Livonia from 1781, political activist, writer, and supporter of Russian Empire.

References

Villages in Jonava District Municipality